Ivan Lendl was the defending champion.

Lendl successfully defended his title, defeating John McEnroe 6–1, 6–3 in the final.

Seeds

  Ivan Lendl (champion)
  John McEnroe (final)
  Andre Agassi (semifinals)
  Tim Mayotte (third round)
  Kevin Curren (third round)
  Jay Berger (semifinals)
  Miloslav Mečíř (second round)
  Yannick Noah (second round)
  Guillermo Pérez Roldán (second round)
  Goran Ivanišević (first round)
  Glenn Layendecker (first round)
  Andrew Sznajder (quarterfinals)
  Kelly Evernden (third round)
  Todd Witsken (second round)
  Richey Reneberg (third round)
  Jimmy Arias (third round)

Draw

Finals

Top half

Section 1

Section 2

Section 3

Section 4

External links
 Main draw

1989 Grand Prix (tennis)